"Stage Fright" is the first and only single taken from Chic's fifth studio album Take It Off. The song features a solo lead vocal by Luci Martin.

Record World said that "the recurring chorus hook and a kinetic rhythm section surround Luci Martin's lead vocal enthusiasm."

Chart positions

Track listings

Atlantic 7" 3887, 1981
 A. "Stage Fright" (7" Edit) - 3:39
 B. "So Fine" - 4:10
Atlantic promo 12" DMD 306, 1981
 A. "Stage Fright" 3:55
 B. "So Fine" - 4:10

References

Songs written by Bernard Edwards
Songs written by Nile Rodgers
1981 singles
Chic (band) songs
Song recordings produced by Nile Rodgers
Song recordings produced by Bernard Edwards
1981 songs